County Road 17, also known as the Coastal Highway, is a Norwegian highway that runs from the town of Bodø in Nordland county (in the north) to the town of Steinkjer in Trøndelag county (in the south). The road runs along the coast of Nordland and Trøndelag counties through 28 different municipalities. This road is a much more scenic, albeit longer and more time-consuming, route than the inland European Route E6 highway.

Prior to 1 January 2010, this was National Road 17, but control and maintenance of the road was transferred to the counties from the national government on that date, so now it is a county road.

Media gallery

References

External links

Kystriksveien (VisitNorway.com)

 
017
017
017
National Tourist Routes in Norway
Roads within the Arctic Circle